National Highway 18 (NH 18)(combination of old NH 32, NH 33 and NH 5) is a  National Highway in India. It originates from Gobindpur, Dhanbad and terminates at Balasore, Odisha covering 361 km (224 mi) distance. It passes through Dhanbad city, Mahuda, Chas, Purulia, Balarampur, Jamshedpur, Ghatshila, Baharagora, Baripada and Balasore. It was earlier NH32 but it got changed in 2012.

References

National highways in India